U.S. Naval Hospital may refer to:

 Walter Reed National Military Medical Center, Bethesda, Maryland
 U.S. Naval Hospital, Subic Bay, the main medical facility of the U.S. Naval Forces, Philippines
 Naval Medical Center San Diego
 Naval Hospital Yokosuka Japan
 U.S. Naval Hospital, Naples